Soufiane "Sofian" Chakla (born 2 September 1993) is a Moroccan professional footballer who plays as a centre back for Spanish club Ponferradina.

Club career
Born in Kenitra, Chakla moved to Spain at the age of eight, and joined Málaga CF's youth setup in 2010. He made his debut as a senior with the reserves in 2012, in Tercera División.

On 27 January 2014, Chakla rescinded with the Andalusians and moved to another reserve team, Real Betis B also in the fourth tier. On 11 July he signed for Hungarian club Videoton FC.

Chakla made his professional debut on 2 November 2014, starting in a 1–0 home win against Budapest Honvéd FC. However, he only appeared in six matches during the whole campaign, and was subsequently released.

On 23 September 2015, after failed trials at Sporting Gijón, Chakla joined Segunda División B club La Roda CF. The following 25 August he moved to fellow league team CD El Ejido 2012.

On 31 May 2017, Chakla signed for UD Almería B in the fourth tier, mainly as a replacement to injured Igor Engonga. On 16 July of the following year, after helping the Andalusians in their promotion, he moved to third division side UD Melilla on a 2+1 contract.

On 17 July 2019, Chakla signed for Villarreal CF; initially assigned to the reserves in division three, he was definitely promoted to the main squad on 27 January 2020. He made his La Liga debut on 19 June, starting in a 1–0 away win against Granada CF.

On 30 January 2021, Chakla joined Getafe CF on loan for the remainder of the 2020–21 season. In August 2021, he moved to Belgian side Oud-Heverlee Leuven.

On 18 January 2023, Chakla returned to Spain after agreeing to a contract with SD Ponferradina in the second level.

International career
He made his debut for Morocco national football team on 30 March 2021 in a 2021 Africa Cup of Nations qualifier against Burundi.

Career statistics

Club

International

References

External links

1993 births
Living people
People from Kenitra
Moroccan footballers
Association football defenders
La Liga players
Segunda División players
Segunda División B players
Tercera División players
Atlético Malagueño players
Betis Deportivo Balompié footballers
La Roda CF players
CD El Ejido players
UD Almería B players
UD Melilla footballers
Villarreal CF B players
Villarreal CF players
Getafe CF footballers
Nemzeti Bajnokság I players
Fehérvár FC players
Oud-Heverlee Leuven players
SD Ponferradina players
Moroccan expatriate footballers
Expatriate footballers in Belgium
Expatriate footballers in Spain
Expatriate footballers in Hungary
Moroccan expatriate sportspeople in Belgium
Moroccan expatriate sportspeople in Spain
Moroccan expatriate sportspeople in Hungary
Morocco under-20 international footballers
Morocco international footballers
2021 Africa Cup of Nations players